Loufan County is a county of Shanxi Province, North China, it is under the administration of the prefecture-level city of Taiyuan, the capital of the province. It is the westernmost county-level division of Taiyuan.

Name
Loufan is named for the Loufan tribe ( Lóufán < Eastern Han Chinese *l(i)o-buɑn < Old Chinese *ro-ban 620 BCE ?, ca.; 307 BCE) in ancient China during the Warring States period, who were conquered by the state of Zhao in two campaigns in 306 and 304BC after the adoption of nomad (Hu) weapons and customs by the King Wuling of Zhao. During Emperor Gaozu of Han's time, Loufan were associated with the Xiongnu.

History
Loufan County formed part of Yanmen Commandery under the Qin and Han. Its former seat is now located in Ningwu County in Xinzhou Prefecture.

Climate

References

Citations

Bibliography
 www.xzqh.org 
 .

County-level divisions of Shanxi